The  was a field army of the Imperial Japanese Army during Second Sino-Japanese War.

History
The Japanese South China Area Army was formed on February 9, 1940 under the control of the China Expeditionary Army. It was transferred to direct control by the Imperial General Headquarters on July 23, 1940. Headquartered in Canton, it was responsible for direction of the Japanese invasion of southern China, garrisoning Japanese-occupied Guangdong Province and controlling military operations in neighboring Guangxi Province. It was disbanded on June 26, 1941 and its component units were reassigned back to the China Expeditionary Army.

On March 9, the 106th Division was recalled to Japan for demobilization from Central China. It was disbanded in Central China in April 1940 never having reached South China.

List of Commanders

Commanding officer

Chief of Staff

References

Books

External links

S
Military units and formations established in 1940
Military units and formations disestablished in 1941